The 2000 Arab Cup Winners' Cup was the 11th edition of the Arab Cup Winners' Cup held in Riyadh, Saudi Arabia between 8 – 22 November 2000. The teams represented Arab nations from Africa and Asia.
Al-Hilal from Saudi Arabia won the final against Al-Nassr from the same country for the first time.

Qualifying round
Al-Hilal (the hosts) and Al-Ittihad (the holders) qualified automatically.

Zone 1 (Gulf Area)
Qualifying tournament held in Dubai, United Arab Emirates. Representatives of Bahrain and Oman withdrew.

|-
!colspan=3|Day 1 

|-
!colspan=3|Day 2 

|-
!colspan=3|Day 3 

Al-Wasl & Al-Arabi advanced to the final tournament. However Al-Wasl withdrew, Al-Rayyan admitted instead.

Zone 2 (Red Sea)
Qualifying tournament held in Cairo, Egypt. Al-Wehda of Yemen withdrew.

|-
!colspan=3|Day 1 

|-
!colspan=3|Day 2 

|-
!colspan=3|Day 3

Zone 3 (North Africa)
Libya representative withdrew.
USM Annaba, Algeria and SCC Mohammédia, Morocco qualified.

Zone 4 (East Region)
Qualifying tournament held in Amman, Jordan.

|-
!colspan=3|Day 1 

|-
!colspan=3|Day 2 

|-
!colspan=3|Day 3 

Al-Wehdat & Jableh SC advanced to the final tournament.

Group stage
Group A

Group B

Knock-out stage

Semi-finals

Final

Winners

References

External links
Arab Cup Winners' Cup 2000 - rsssf.com''

2000
2000 in association football
International association football competitions hosted by Saudi Arabia
2000 in Saudi Arabian sport